Romanus Orjinta (12 August 1981 – ) was a  Nigerian footballer who played as a defender.

Career
In 2003, he was the captain from Enyimba International F.C. before transferred to Lillestrøm SK. In 2007 through his Egyptian agent Mohamed Mohsen, the player was going to sign with the Egyptian club aleZamk SC but the club dismissed the contract with him after discovering that the player had AIDS. On 26 August 2008 former Nigerian International, Romanus Orjinta, resurrected his career with Niger Tornadoes F.C.

On New Year's Eve 2014, Orjinta was found dead in his home.

Titles
 CAF Champions League 2003 Winner with Enyimba International F.C.

References

External links
 

1981 births
2014 deaths
Nigerian footballers
Nigerian expatriate footballers
Association football midfielders
Enyimba F.C. players
Lillestrøm SK players
Rangers International F.C. players
Expatriate footballers in Norway
Heartland F.C. players
Nigerian expatriate sportspeople in Norway
Niger Tornadoes F.C. players
2004 African Cup of Nations players
Nigeria international footballers